The 2020 Foxwoods Resort Casino 301 was a NASCAR Cup Series race held on August 2, 2020 at New Hampshire Motor Speedway in Loudon, New Hampshire. Originally scheduled for July 19th, but postponed due to the COVID-19 pandemic. Contested over 301 laps on the  speedway, it was the 20th race of the 2020 NASCAR Cup Series season.

Report

Background

New Hampshire Motor Speedway is a  oval speedway located in Loudon, New Hampshire, which has hosted NASCAR racing annually since the early 1990s, as well as the longest-running motorcycle race in North America, the Loudon Classic. Nicknamed "The Magic Mile", the speedway is often converted into a  road course, which includes much of the oval.

The track was originally the site of Bryar Motorsports Park before being purchased and redeveloped by Bob Bahre. The track is currently one of eight major NASCAR tracks owned and operated by Speedway Motorsports.

Entry list
 (R) denotes rookie driver.
 (i) denotes driver who are ineligible for series driver points.

Qualifying
Aric Almirola was awarded the pole for the race as determined by a random draw.

Starting Lineup

Race

Stage Results

Stage One
Laps: 75

Stage Two
Laps: 110

Final Stage Results

Stage Three
Laps: 116

Race statistics
 Lead changes: 22 among 7 different drivers
 Cautions/Laps: 11 for 52
 Red flags: 0
 Time of race: 3 hours, 10 minutes and 22 seconds
 Average speed:

Media

Television
NBC Sports covered the race on the television side. Rick Allen, four-time and all-time Loudon winner Jeff Burton, Steve Letarte and Dale Earnhardt Jr. covered the race from the booth at Charlotte Motor Speedway. Parker Kligerman and Marty Snider handled the pit road duties on site, and Rutledge Wood handled the features from his home during the race.

Radio
PRN had the radio call for the race, which was also simulcast on Sirius XM NASCAR Radio. Doug Rice and Mark Garrow called the race from the booth when the field races down the frontstretch. Rob Albright called the race from turns 1 & 2 and Pat Patterson called the race from turns 3 & 4. Brad Gillie and Jim Noble handled the duties on pit lane.

Standings after the race

Drivers' Championship standings

Manufacturers' Championship standings

Note: Only the first 16 positions are included for the driver standings.
. – Driver has clinched a position in the NASCAR Cup Series playoffs.

References

2020 Foxwoods Resort Casino 301
2020 NASCAR Cup Series
2020 in sports in New Hampshire
August 2020 sports events in the United States